The following highways are numbered 154:

Brazil
 BR-154

Canada
 Prince Edward Island Route 154 (Pridham Road)

Costa Rica
 National Route 154

India
 National Highway 154 (India)

Japan
 Japan National Route 154

United States
 U.S. Route 154 (former)
 Alabama State Route 154
 Arkansas Highway 154
 California State Route 154
 Connecticut Route 154
 Georgia State Route 154 (former)
 Georgia State Route 154
 Illinois Route 154
 Indiana State Road 154
 K-154 (Kansas highway)
 Kentucky Route 154
 Louisiana Highway 154
 Maine State Route 154
 M-154 (Michigan highway)
 Missouri Route 154
 New Jersey Route 154
 New Mexico State Road 154
 New York State Route 154 (former)
 Ohio State Route 154
 Oregon Route 154
 Pennsylvania Route 154
 South Carolina Highway 154
 Tennessee State Route 154
 Texas State Highway 154
 Utah State Route 154
 Virginia State Route 154
 Wisconsin Highway 154
 Wyoming Highway 154
Territories
 Puerto Rico Highway 154